Robinsons Palawan (formerly Robinsons Place Palawan) is a shopping mall owned and operated by Robinsons Malls, the second largest mall operator in the Philippines. It is the 31st in the Robinsons mall chain and the first and largest full service mall in the province of Palawan. The mall opened on May 24, 2012.

The 16-hectare mall houses a 300-seat food court, al fresco dining outlets, fashion boutiques, specialty shops, banks, an amusement center, service outlets and cellphone and gadget shops. It is located 5 kilometers north of Puerto Princesa city proper along the North National Highway.

In September 2014, the Department of Foreign Affairs inaugurated its first mall-based passport office in the Mimaropa region at the mall's second level.

References

Shopping malls in the Philippines
Shopping malls established in 2012
Buildings and structures in Puerto Princesa
Tourist attractions in Puerto Princesa
Robinsons Malls